The 2018 TCR Europe Touring Car Series was the third holding of TCR Europe, and first held as a standalone series. The series began at the Circuit Paul Ricard in May and ended at the Circuit de Barcelona-Catalunya in October.

As part of an deal with the series' promoters, at five of the seven events, the 2018 TCR BeNeLux Touring Car Championship series was held which was its third edition.

TCR Europe Series also saw the introduction of the DSG Challenge for cars equipped with Direct-shift gearbox.

Calendar

Teams and drivers

Yokohama is the official tire supplier.

Results and standings

TCR Europe standings

Drivers' standings 

† – Drivers did not finish the race, but were classified as they completed over 75% of the race distance.

Teams' standings

† – Drivers did not finish the race, but were classified as they completed over 75% of the race distance.

DSG Challenge

TCR BeNeLux Drivers' standings 

† – Drivers did not finish the race, but were classified as they completed over 75% of the race distance.

Footnotes

References

External links

2018 in European sport
Europe Series